The Canadian Institute for Human Services (CIHS) is an advocacy, education and action research organization for the advancement of health equity, progressive education, and social innovation. The institute collaborates with researchers, field practitioners, community organizations, socially conscious companies—along with various levels of government and educational institutions—to ensure that the Canadian human services sector remains accountable to the greater good of Canadian civil society rather than short-term professional, business or economic gains.

History
The Canadian Institute for Human Services was federally incorporated on March 11, 2014 and was governed under the Canada Not-for-profit Corporations Act. It was dissolved by the corporation (s. 220) on 2016-09-26

See also

Works Cited

Learned societies of Canada
Research institutes in Canada